Coman and Others v Inspectoratul General pentru Imigrări and Ministerul Afacerilor Interne is a 2018 case of the European Court of Justice (ECJ) that affirmed residency rights in EU countries (that do not recognise same-sex unions), to the spouse of an EU citizen who is exercising their right to freedom of movement and if the marriage was legally performed in an EU member state.

, Romania has yet to implement the verdict by granting Coman's partner a residence permit. On 14 September 2021 the European Parliament passed a resolution calling on the European Commission to ensure that the ruling is respected across the EU.

EU law
Article 21 TFEU defines that "every citizen of the Union shall have the right to move and reside freely within the territory of the Member States."

Directive 2004/38/EC (the Citizens’ Rights Directive or Free Movement Directive) defines this right. It grants the same freedom to family members of Union citizens (including spouses), even if they are not nationals of an EU member state. "Family members" (Article 2(2)) include the spouse, the registered partner, a child under 21, or a dependent child or parent (of the Union citizen or partner). There is a second category of "any other family member", which can be included at the discretion of national legislation.

The Charter of Fundamental Rights of the European Union affirms the freedom of movement and of residence (Article 45) and furthermore guarantees the right to respect for private and family life (Article 7), guarantees the right to marry (Article 9) and prohibits discrimination based on, among other grounds, sex and sexual orientation (Article 21).

Case background
In 2010, Adrian Coman, a Romanian national and thus EU citizen, married Claibourn Robert Hamilton, a citizen of the United States, in Belgium, an EU member state where same-sex marriage is legal. The Civil Code of Coman's home country Romania prohibits same-sex marriage and does not recognise same-sex marriages performed abroad. On these grounds, the Romanian immigration authorities denied a residence permit for his spouse when the couple wanted to move back after living in the United States. They challenged the decision before the Court of First Instance in Bucharest, which referred the case to the Constitutional Court of Romania, which in turn asked for a preliminary ruling from the European Court of Justice.

The European Commission and the Netherlands intervened on behalf of the applicants, while Latvia, Poland, and Hungary filed briefs supporting Romania's position. Advocate-General Melchior Wathelet issued a legal opinion supporting the applicants.

Preliminary questions
The questions referred by the Constitutional Court of Romania to the European Court of Justice on 29 November 2016 were:

Ruling
A hearing was held on 21 November 2017. The Advocate General Melchior Wathelet delivered his opinion on 11 January 2018. The Court followed the opinion and ruled as follows in Grand Chamber on 5 June 2018:

Reception
According to law professors Dimitry Kochenov and Uladzislau Belavusau, the ruling against Romania was anticipated by legal experts, as "The outcome was mandated by the language of the relevant legal provisions since their inception". Kochenov and Belavusau also state that "Coman is among the best-founded decisions of the Court in its history from the viewpoints of legal certainty and the articulation of the letter and the spirit of the law." They note that, in light of European Court of Human Rights rulings in Oliari and Others v. Italy (in which Italy was required to provide some form of legal recognition to same-sex couples) and Pajić v. Croatia (in which Croatia was required to grant residency rights to a Bosnian citizen in a same-sex relationship with a Croatian citizen), "if only Romania was a state compliant with ECHR law, no recourse to EU law would be necessary at all in this case".

See also

 LGBT rights in the European Union
 Recognition of same-sex unions in Europe
 Schalk and Kopf v Austria (2010  European Court of Human Rights case)
 Obergefell v. Hodges (2015 United States Supreme Court case)

References

Further reading

2018 in case law
Court of Justice of the European Union case law
LGBT rights case law